The Jinhai Pulp Mill also known as Hainan Jinhai Pulp and Paper is the largest pulp mill in China, and the world's largest single-line pulp mill.

Located on a 4 km2. area in Yangpu Economic Development Zone, the mill uses the Hainan PM 2, the world's largest paper machine. The machine is 428m long and 11.6m wide, producing paper that is 10.96m wide.

Using nine large presses, the mill has a capacity of 1,200,000 metric tons per year.

The first phase of the project involved an investment of 10.2 billion RMB.

The mill produces hardwood kraft paper using roughly equal volumes of fibre from Eucalyptus grandis and  Acacia crassicarpa sourced largely from Asia Pulp and Paper's 233,300 hectare 
plantation forests located on Hainan island, with additional pulp imported from Indonesia, 
Cambodia, and Vietnam.

Technical specifications

Stock preparation
DIP  355 tons per day
NBKP 710 tons per day
LBKP 1,655 tons per day
BCTMP 1,185 tons per day
PCC 700 tons per day

Paper machine
Uncoated paper weight: 151.1 g/m2
Finished paper weight: 255.3 g/m2
Wire width: 11,800 mm
Maximum operating speed: 1,700 m/min
Design speed: 2,000 m/min
Speed of Janus: 1,500 m/min
Speed of VariPlus: 2,500 m/min
Parent roll diameter: 3,500 mm
Maximum production: 4,537 tons per day

References

External links
Website at APP

Companies based in Hainan
Pulp and paper companies of China
2004 establishments in China